This article contains a list of the most studied restriction enzymes whose names start with Ba to Bc inclusive.  It contains approximately 120 enzymes.

The following information is given:



Whole list navigation

Restriction enzymes

Ba - Bc

Notes

Restriction enzyme cutting sites
Biotechnology
Restriction enzymes